Tell It Like a Woman is a 2022 American–Italian anthology film. Premiering at the Taormina Film Fest, Tell It Like a Woman is an anthology of seven short stories directed by women, about women, for everyone, both in front of and behind the camera; it was filmed in different parts of the world.

The film received a nomination at the 95th Academy Awards for Best Original Song for "Applause" by Diane Warren.

Premise
Tell It Like a Woman is a feature film composed of seven short stories whose common denominator is the representation of female protagonists. Each of these very different women faces a particular challenge in their life with extreme determination and courage that makes them stronger and more self-aware. Some of these inspirational and empowering stories, which take place all over the world, are inspired by true events, while others are narrative fiction.

Cast

 Cara Delevingne
 Marcia Gay Harden
 Margherita Buy as Diana
 Eva Longoria as Ana
 Danielle Pinnock as Debra
 Leonor Varela as Tala
 Nate' Jones as Evelyn
 Jennifer Hudson as Kim Carter / Pepcy
 Pauletta Washington
 Jacqueline Fernandez as Divya
 Jesse Garcia
 Alex Bentley as Javi
 Jennifer Ulrich as Greta
 Katia Gomez as Maricela Lopez
 Katie McGovern as Teresa
 Anne Watanabe
 Brandon Win
 Ayesha Harris as Phyllis
 Gabriel Ellis as Ray
 Jasmine Luv
 Holly Gilliam
 Iacopo Ricciotti as Edoardo
 Sergio Allard as Assistant
 Freddy Drabble as Tony
 Flaminia Sartini as Nora
 Anjali Lama
 Andrea Vergoni as Marco

Production
The film was shot in India, Italy, Japan, and the United States.

Release
The film premiered at the Taormina Film Fest (TFF), where it won the TFF Excellence Award.

It arrived on VOD platforms – including Google Play, Prime Video, and Vudu – on February 17, 2023.

Box office

Reception

Accolades

References

External links
 

2022 films
Films shot in India
Films shot in Italy
Films shot in Japan
2020s Italian films
2020s feminist films
2020s American films
American drama films
2022 independent films
American anthology films
American independent films
2020s English-language films
Films shot in the United States